Typhonium nudibaccatum is a species of plant in the arum family that is endemic to Australia.

Description
The species is a geophytic, perennial herb, which sprouts from a corm about 2.5 cm in diameter. The leaves are deeply trilobed. The purple, red or black flower is enclosed in a spathe 7–11 cm long, appearing from January to April.

Distribution and habitat
The species occurs on the tropical Mitchell Plateau in the Northern Kimberley IBRA bioregion, in north-western Western Australia, where it is found on lateritic loam soils on basalt substrates on ridges and drainage lines.

References

 
nudibaccatum
Monocots of Australia
Flora of Western Australia
Plants described in 1993
Taxa named by Alistair Hay